Oleksandr Oleksandrovych Hlahola (born 19 July 1997) is a Ukrainian professional footballer who plays as an attacking midfielder for Bukovyna Chernivtsi.

Career
In March 2023 he moved to Bukovyna Chernivtsi in Ukrainian First League.

References

External links
 Profile on Polissya Zhytomyr official website
 

1997 births
Living people
People from Svaliava
Ukrainian footballers
Association football midfielders
FC Shakhtar Donetsk players
FC Mynai players
FC Polissya Zhytomyr players
FC Uzhhorod players
Ukrainian Premier League players
Ukrainian First League players
Sportspeople from Zakarpattia Oblast